This is the list of the episodes for the American cooking television series and competition Food Network Challenge, broadcast on Food Network.

Season 1

Season 2

Season 3

Season 4

Season 5

Season 6

Season 7

Season 8

Season 9

Season 10

Season 11

Season 12

Season 13

Food Network Challenge
Food Network Challenge